Fort Worth United Soccer Club is the oldest competitive soccer club from Fort Worth, Texas. It is a non-profit 501(c)(3) organization, dedicated to the ongoing development of soccer skills for both young men and young women. In 1966, Alexander Everett (1921–2005) formed and coached the first Fort Worth United team under the Fort Worth United Soccer Club banner. The inaugural team included several notable players including Dave Rubinson, former Head Soccer Coach at TCU. The team played several years together in Dallas and traveled to compete against teams from all across the United States. During their first three years of existence, the team dominated their competition and never lost a single game (including a 3–1 Texas Championship win in Houston in the Astrodome against San Antonio Saints and Devils).

Five years later, an additional team was added – the Fort Worth United '71 team was formed with local players born in 1971. That group of 10-year-old boys stayed together until high school graduation in 1989, during which time the Fort Worth United Soccer Club, Inc. was officially incorporated (in 1980). During their eight years together, the 71 team enjoyed much success. The highlight of that team's history came in 1987 when the team reached the Quarterfinals in Denmark's Dana Cup, and the Semifinals in Sweden's Gothia Cup. In both cases the Fort Worth United 71', 16 & Under youth team ran up against an adult team from Iraq who had forged passports to play in the 16 & Under group. Against the odds the "kids" from Texas held the lead against the Iraq adults deep into the second half in Denmark, as well as holding their own in the Semifinals in Sweden. Although outsized by the full grown men, FWU 71' fought with all they had until the very end, which was by no means an unusual team attribute. They had done so together since the team's formation and continued to do until each player went off to college. The experience created a band of brothers that stay in touch with one another until this day.

During those years, the club expanded to include a new boys' team each year and soon grew to become one of the largest competitive soccer clubs in Texas. In 1997, the club began a girls' program with the first team being the girls '81 team. Thus, Fort Worth United not only pioneered girls' select soccer in the Fort Worth–Dallas area, but also has produced teams at all age levels competing in the most prestigious leagues in North Texas.

By the early 2000s, FWU was a well established soccer club when they began organizational and operational changes intended to solidify the club's presence and lay the foundation for future growth. The introduction of many innovative training programs, development of private practice facilities, and launching of several community initiatives served to fuel the club's growth. Today, Fort Worth United Soccer Club is one of the top 20 largest competitive clubs in Texas and fields some of the highest-ranked teams in the north Texas area.

External links
Fort Worth United Soccer Club Official web site

Sports in Fort Worth, Texas
Association football clubs established in 1966
Soccer clubs in Texas
1966 establishments in Texas